The Royal Society of Canada (RSC; , SRC), also known as the Academies of Arts, Humanities, and Sciences of Canada (French: Académies des arts, des lettres et des sciences du Canada), is the senior national, bilingual council of distinguished Canadian scholars, humanists, scientists, and artists. The primary objective of the RSC is to promote learning and research in the arts, the humanities, and the sciences. The RSC is Canada's national academy and exists to promote Canadian research and scholarly accomplishment in both official languages; to recognize academic and artistic excellence; and to advise governments, non-governmental organizations, and Canadians on matters of public interest.

History
In the late 1870s, the Governor General of Canada, John Campbell, Marquis of Lorne, determined that Canada required a cultural institution to promote national scientific research and development. Since that time, succeeding governors general have remained involved with the affairs of the Society. In 1882, the Royal Society of Canada was founded with the personal patronage of Lord Lorne. A year later, in 1883, the Society was incorporated by an act of the Parliament of Canada.

From its founding until the early 1900s, the structure of the RSC imitated the model of the Royal Society of London, but with the important addition of literature and other elements found in the Institut de France. Like their counterparts, membership to the RSC was limited and by election. Initially, the RSC was divided into four sections, each of 20 Fellows. These sections were: French literature, history, and archaeology; English literature, history, and archaeology; mathematical, physical and chemical sciences; and geological and biological sciences. The founding fellows of the RSC included Sandford Fleming, the originator of the world system of Standard Time, and William Osler, one of the greatest physicians of his time. The fellows of the RSC were nominated by a committee directed by the Principal of McGill University, John William Dawson, and by the former Premier of Quebec, Pierre Chauveau. These two men served as the first and second presidents of the Society.

As Canadian scholarship and research increased, the RSC also grew. Within three decades, the fellowship of the RSC doubled in number. After several phases of restructuring, the RSC evolved its contemporary organization. In 2010, Governor General David Johnston was elected as an honorary gellow of the Society.

Organization and purpose
The Royal Society of Canada currently consists of more than 2,000 fellows: men and women from all branches of learning who have made contributions in the arts, the humanities, and the sciences, as well as in Canadian public life. Presently, the fellowship comprises four categories: regularly elected fellows, specially elected fellows, foreign fellows, and honorary fellows. Each year, approximately 80 people are elected to the fellowship. This cohort includes approximately 75 regularly elected fellows recommended by the divisions, as many as six specially elected fellows, as many as four foreign fellows, and a maximum of one honorary fellow. Once inducted into the Society, anglophone fellows may use the post-nominal letters FRSC (fellow of the Royal Society of Canada) and francophone fellows may use MSRC (membre de la Société royale du Canada). 

The RSC is composed of three bilingual academies, including a broad range of scholarly disciplines and artistic fields. Academy I is the Academy of Arts and Humanities. There are three divisions of Academy I: an anglophone division, humanities; a francophone division, letters and humanities; and a bilingual division for the arts, embracing architecture, creative writing, and other arts. Academy II is the Academy of Social Sciences. There are two divisions of Academy II: an anglophone division, social sciences; and a francophone division, social sciences. Academy III is the Academy of Science. There are four bilingual divisions of Academy III: Applied sciences and engineering; Earth, ocean, and atmospheric sciences; life sciences; and mathematical and physical sciences.

The Society is dedicated to making its members’ varied knowledge available to the public. Members are available to assess issues of presumed value to Canadians and provide independent expert advice, notably to government on matters of public policy through its program of expert panel reports.

The College of New Scholars, Artists, and Scientists
The College of New Scholars, Artists, and Scientists of the RSC was established in 2014 to represent emerging generation of intellectual leaders in Canada. It elects 80-100 members each year, who showed high level of accomplishments at the early stage of their careers. At the time of election, members of the College must have received a PhD or equivalent degree within the past 15 years. Nomination of candidates for the College follows a similar procedures as nomination for the fellows of RSC.

Institutional members
The RSC officially began the Institutional Member (IM) Program in 2004. The goal was to provide a mechanism by which the Society could develop its programs in conjunction with Canadian universities and by which universities could have formal and direct input into the strategic organization and governance of the Society. This closer relationship facilitates the nomination of new fellows from all Canadian universities and provides a means for the Society to sponsor scholarly activities at institutions of all sizes across Canada. Presently, 46 universities and the National Research Council of Canada are institutional members of the Society.

Medals and awards

The RSC recognizes notable achievements in research and innovation by awarding medals and prizes. Twenty Society awards are offered on an annual or biennial basis and consist of either medals or certificates, some of them with cash prizes. These awards are as follows:

 Ursula Franklin Award in Gender Studies: Awarded to a Canadian scholar for "significant contributions [...] in the humanities and social sciences to furthering our understanding of issues concerning gender." It is awarded biannually, given there is a suitable candidate.
 Bancroft Award for publication, instruction, and research in the earth sciences that have conspicuously contributed to public understanding and appreciation of the subject.
 Centenary Medal to honour individuals and organizations that have made outstanding contributions to the object of the RSC and to recognize links to international organizations.
 Henry Marshall Tory Medal for outstanding research in a branch of astronomy, chemistry, mathematics, physics, or an allied science.
 Innis-Gérin Medal for a distinguished and sustained contribution to the literature of the social sciences including human geography and social psychology.
 J.B. Tyrrell Historical Medal for outstanding work in the history of Canada.
 John L. Synge Award for outstanding research in any mathematical topic.
 Lorne Pierce Medal for an achievement of special significance and conspicuous merit in imaginative or critical literature, written in either English or French. Critical literature dealing with Canadian subjects is given priority over critical literature of equal merit that does not deal with Canadian subjects.
 Miroslaw Romanowski Medal for significant contributions to the resolution of scientific aspects of environmental problems or for important improvements to the quality of an ecosystem in all aspects—terrestrial, atmospheric, and aqueous—brought about by scientific means.
 Pierre Chauveau Medal for a distinguished contribution to knowledge in the humanities, other than Canadian literature and Canadian history.
 Rutherford Memorial Medal for outstanding research in chemistry.
 Rutherford Memorial Medal for outstanding research in physics.
 Sir John William Dawson Medal for important and sustained contributions in two domains of interest to RSC or in interdisciplinary research.
 The Alice Wilson Award for outstanding academic qualifications of a woman who is entering a career in scholarship or research at the postdoctoral level.
 The Flavelle Medal is awarded for an outstanding contribution to biological science during the preceding 10 years or for significant additions to a previous outstanding contribution to biological science.
 The McLaughlin Medal for important research of sustained excellence in any branch of medical sciences.
 The McNeil Medal for outstanding ability to promote and communicate science to students and to the public within Canada.
 Willet G. Miller Medal for outstanding research in any of the earth sciences.
 The Konrad Adenauer Research Award for the promotion of academic collaboration between Canada and Germany, presented to honour the scholar's entire academic record.
 The EJLB-CIHR Michael Smith Chair in Neurosciences and Mental Health, which allows a Canadian university or health research institute to attract a major scientist of neurosciences and mental health to Canada. It is offered by the EJLB Foundation, the Canadian Institutes of Health Research (CIHR), the CIHR Institute of Neurosciences, Mental Health and Addiction (INMHA), and the RSC.

See also
 List of presidents of the Royal Society of Canada
 :Category:Fellows of the Royal Society of Canada
 List of Canadian organizations with royal patronage

References

Citations

Sources

 Chenier, Nancy Miller, and Claude Le Moine. The Royal Society of Canada, 1881-1981 ... to Commemorate the Centennial of the Royal Society of Canada = La Société royale du Canada, 1881-1981 ... afin de commémorer le centenaire de la Société royale du Canada. Ottawa: National Library of Canada, 1982. N.B.: Published on the occasion of an "exhibition presented by the National Library of Canada, June 1 to September 6, 1982...." Text, printed in the double page columns, in English and in French.

External links

 The Royal Society of Canada website
 The Royal Society of Canada fonds (R9351) at Library and Archives Canada

 
1882 establishments in Ontario
Scientific organizations based in Canada
Learned societies of Canada
Canada
Organizations based in Canada with royal patronage
Organizations established in 1882
Scientific organizations established in 1882